The 54th United States Congress was a meeting of the legislative branch of the United States federal government, consisting of the United States Senate and the United States House of Representatives. It met in Washington, D.C., from March 4, 1895, to March 4, 1897, during the last two years of Grover Cleveland's second presidency. The apportionment of seats in the House of Representatives was based on the 1890 United States census. The House had a Republican majority, and the Republicans were the largest party in the Senate.

Major events

Major legislation

 May 21, 1896:  Oil Pipe Line Act, ch. 212,     ( et seq.)
 May 22, 1896: Condemned Cannon Act,       
 May 28, 1896: United States Commissioners Act, 
 June 1, 1896: Married Women's Rights Act (District of Columbia),    
 June 6, 1896: Filled Cheese Act, 
 January 13, 1897: Stock Reservoir Act, ( et seq.) 
 March 2, 1897: Tea Importation Act,  ( et seq.)

States admitted 
 January 4, 1896: Utah was admitted as the 45th state.

Party summary

This count identifies party affiliations at the beginning of the first session of this Congress, and includes members from vacancies and newly admitted states, when they were first seated. Changes resulting from subsequent replacements are shown below in the "Changes in membership" section.

Senate

House of Representatives

Leadership

Senate 
 President: Adlai E. Stevenson (D)
 President pro tempore: William P. Frye (R)

Majority (Republican) leadership 
 Republican Conference Chairman: John Sherman

Minority (Democratic) leadership 
 Democratic Caucus Chairman: Arthur P. Gorman

House of Representatives 
 Speaker: Thomas B. Reed (R)

Majority (Republican) leadership 
 Republican Conference Chairman: Charles H. Grosvenor
 Republican Campaign Committee Chairman: Joseph W. Babcock

Minority (Democratic) leadership 
 Democratic Caucus Chairman: David B. Culberson
 Democratic Campaign Committee Chairman: Charles James Faulkner

Members
This list is arranged by chamber, then by state. Senators are listed by class, and representatives are listed by district.
Skip to House of Representatives, below

Senate
Senators were elected by the state legislatures every two years, with one-third beginning new six-year terms with each Congress. Preceding the names in the list below are Senate class numbers, which indicate the cycle of their election. In this Congress, Class 1 meant their term began in the last Congress, requiring re-election in 1898; Class 2 meant their term began in this Congress, requiring re-election in 1900; and Class 3 meant their term ended in this Congress, requiring re-election in 1896.

Alabama 
 2. John T. Morgan (D)
 3. James L. Pugh (D)

Arkansas 
 2. James H. Berry (D)
 3. James K. Jones (D)

California 
 1. Stephen M. White (D)
 3. George C. Perkins (R)

Colorado 
 2. Edward O. Wolcott (R)
 3. Henry M. Teller (R)

Connecticut 
 1. Joseph R. Hawley (R)
 3. Orville H. Platt (R)

Delaware 
 1. George Gray (D)
 2. Richard R. Kenney (D), from January 19, 1897

Florida 
 1. Samuel Pasco (D)
 3. Wilkinson Call (D)

Georgia 
 2. Augustus O. Bacon (D)
 3. John B. Gordon (D)

Idaho 
 2. George L. Shoup (R)
 3. Fred T. Dubois (R)

Illinois 
 2. Shelby M. Cullom (R)
 3. John McAuley Palmer (D)

Indiana 
 1. David Turpie (D)
 3. Daniel W. Voorhees (D)

Iowa 
 2. John H. Gear (R)
 3. William B. Allison (R)

Kansas 
 2. Lucien Baker (R)
 3. William A. Peffer (P)

Kentucky 
 2. William Lindsay (D)
 3. Joseph C. S. Blackburn (D)

Louisiana 
 2. Donelson Caffery (D)
 3. Newton C. Blanchard (D)

Maine 
 1. Eugene Hale (R)
 2. William P. Frye (R)

Maryland 
 1. Arthur Pue Gorman (D)
 3. Charles H. Gibson (D)

Massachusetts 
 1. Henry Cabot Lodge (R)
 2. George F. Hoar (R)

Michigan 
 1. Julius C. Burrows (R)
 2. James McMillan (R)

Minnesota 
 1. Cushman K. Davis (R)
 2. Knute Nelson (R)

Mississippi 
 1. James Z. George (D)
 2. Edward C. Walthall (D)

Missouri 
 1. Francis M. Cockrell (D)
 3. George G. Vest (D)

Montana 
 1. Lee Mantle (R)
 2. Thomas H. Carter (R)

Nebraska 
 1. William V. Allen (P)
 2. John M. Thurston (R)

Nevada 
 1. William M. Stewart (S)
 3. John P. Jones (S)

New Hampshire 
 2. William E. Chandler (R)
 3. Jacob H. Gallinger (R)

New Jersey 
 1. James Smith Jr. (D)
 2. William J. Sewell (R)

New York 
 1. Edward Murphy Jr. (D)
 3. David B. Hill (D)

North Carolina 
 2. Marion Butler (P)
 3. Jeter C. Pritchard (R)

North Dakota 
 1. William N. Roach (D)
 3. Henry C. Hansbrough (R)

Ohio 
 1. John Sherman (R)
 3. Calvin S. Brice (D)

Oregon 
 2. George W. McBride (R)
 3. John H. Mitchell (R)

Pennsylvania 
 1. Matthew S. Quay (R)
 3. J. Donald Cameron (R)

Rhode Island 
 1. Nelson W. Aldrich (R)
 2. George P. Wetmore (R)

South Carolina 
 2. Benjamin R. Tillman (D)
 3. John L. M. Irby (D)

South Dakota 
 2. Richard F. Pettigrew (R)
 3. James H. Kyle (P)

Tennessee 
 1. William B. Bate (D)
 2. Isham G. Harris (D)

Texas 
 1. Roger Q. Mills (D)
 2. Horace Chilton (D)

Utah 
 1. Frank J. Cannon (R), from January 22, 1896
 3. Arthur Brown (R), from January 22, 1896

Vermont 
 1. Redfield Proctor (R)
 3. Justin S. Morrill (R)

Virginia 
 1. John W. Daniel (D)
 2. Thomas S. Martin (D)

Washington 
 1. John L. Wilson (R)
 3. Watson C. Squire (R)

West Virginia 
 1. Charles J. Faulkner (D)
 2. Stephen B. Elkins (R)

Wisconsin 
 1. John L. Mitchell (D)
 3. William F. Vilas (D)

Wyoming 
 1. Clarence D. Clark (R)
 2. Francis E. Warren (R)

House of Representatives
The names of members of the House of Representatives are preceded by their district numbers.

Alabama 
 . Richard H. Clarke (D)
 . Jesse F. Stallings (D)
 . George P. Harrison (D)
 . Gaston A. Robbins (D), until March 13, 1896
 William F. Aldrich (R), from March 13, 1896
 . James E. Cobb (D), until April 21, 1896
 Albert T. Goodwyn (P), from April 22, 1896
 . John H. Bankhead (D)
 . Milford W. Howard (P)
 . Joseph Wheeler (D)
 . Oscar Underwood (D), until June 9, 1896
 Truman H. Aldrich (R), from June 9, 1896

Arkansas 
 . Philip D. McCulloch Jr. (D)
 . John S. Little (D)
 . Thomas C. McRae (D)
 . William L. Terry (D)
 . Hugh A. Dinsmore (D)
 . Robert Neill (D)

California 
 . John A. Barham (R)
 . Grove L. Johnson (R)
 . Samuel G. Hilborn (R)
 . James G. Maguire (D)
 . Eugene F. Loud (R)
 . James McLachlan (R)
 . William W. Bowers (R)

Colorado 
 . John F. Shafroth (R)
 . John C. Bell (P)

Connecticut 
 . E. Stevens Henry (R)
 . Nehemiah D. Sperry (R)
 . Charles A. Russell (R)
 . Ebenezer J. Hill (R)

Delaware 
 . Jonathan S. Willis (R)

Florida 
 . Stephen M. Sparkman (D)
 . Charles M. Cooper (D)

Georgia 
 . Rufus E. Lester (D)
 . Benjamin E. Russell (D)
 . Charles F. Crisp (D), until October 23, 1896
 Charles R. Crisp (D), from December 19, 1896
 . Charles L. Moses (D)
 . Leonidas F. Livingston (D)
 . Charles L. Bartlett (D)
 . John W. Maddox (D)
 . Thomas G. Lawson (D)
 . Farish C. Tate (D)
 . James C. C. Black (D), until March 4, 1895
 James C. C. Black (D), from October 2, 1895
 . Henry G. Turner (D)

Idaho 
 . Edgar Wilson (R)

Illinois 
 . J. Frank Aldrich (R)
 . William Lorimer (R)
 . Lawrence E. McGann (D), until December 27, 1895
 Hugh R. Belknap (R), from December 27, 1895
 . Charles W. Woodman (R)
 . George E. White (R)
 . Edward D. Cooke (R)
 . George E. Foss (R)
 . Albert J. Hopkins (R)
 . Robert R. Hitt (R)
 . George W. Prince (R), from December 2, 1895
 . Walter Reeves (R)
 . Joseph G. Cannon (R)
 . Vespasian Warner (R)
 . Joseph V. Graff (R)
 . Benjamin F. Marsh (R)
 . Finis E. Downing (D), until June 5, 1896
 John I. Rinaker (R), from June 5, 1896
 . James A. Connolly (R)
 . Frederick Remann (R), until July 14, 1895
 William F. L. Hadley (R), from December 2, 1895
 . Benson Wood (R)
 . Orlando Burrell (R)
 . Everett J. Murphy (R)
 . George Washington Smith (R)

Indiana 
 . James A. Hemenway (R)
 . Alexander M. Hardy (R)
 . Robert J. Tracewell (R)
 . James E. Watson (R)
 . Jesse Overstreet (R)
 . Henry U. Johnson (R)
 . Charles L. Henry (R)
 . George W. Faris (R)
 . J. Frank Hanly (R)
 . Jethro A. Hatch (R)
 . George W. Steele (R)
 . Jacob D. Leighty (R)
 . Lemuel W. Royse (R)

Iowa 
 . Samuel M. Clark (R)
 . George M. Curtis (R)
 . David B. Henderson (R)
 . Thomas Updegraff (R)
 . Robert G. Cousins (R)
 . John F. Lacey (R)
 . John A. T. Hull (R)
 . William P. Hepburn (R)
 . Alva L. Hager (R)
 . Jonathan P. Dolliver (R)
 . George D. Perkins (R)

Kansas 
 . Case Broderick (R)
 . Orrin L. Miller (R)
 . Snyder S. Kirkpatrick (R)
 . Charles Curtis (R)
 . William A. Calderhead (R)
 . William Baker (P)
 . Chester I. Long (R)
 . Richard W. Blue (R)

Kentucky 
 . John K. Hendrick (D)
 . John D. Clardy (D)
 . W. Godfrey Hunter (R)
 . John W. Lewis (R)
 . Walter Evans (R)
 . Albert S. Berry (D)
 . William C. Owens (D)
 . James B. McCreary (D)
 . Samuel J. Pugh (R)
 . Joseph M. Kendall (D), until February 18, 1897
 Nathan T. Hopkins (R), from February 18, 1897
 . David G. Colson (R)

Louisiana 
 . Adolph Meyer (D)
 . Charles F. Buck (D)
 . Andrew Price (D)
 . Henry W. Ogden (D)
 . Charles J. Boatner (D), until March 20, 1896
 Charles J. Boatner (D), from June 10, 1896
 . Samuel M. Robertson (D)

Maine 
 . Thomas B. Reed (R)
 . Nelson Dingley Jr. (R)
 . Seth L. Milliken (R)
 . Charles A. Boutelle (R)

Maryland 
 . Joshua W. Miles (D)
 . William B. Baker (R)
 . Henry W. Rusk (D)
 . John K. Cowen (D)
 . Charles E. Coffin (R)
 . George L. Wellington (R)

Massachusetts 
 . Ashley B. Wright (R)
 . Frederick H. Gillett (R)
 . Joseph H. Walker (R)
 . Lewis D. Apsley (R)
 . William S. Knox (R)
 . William Cogswell (R), until May 22, 1895
 William H. Moody (R), from November 5, 1895
 . William E. Barrett (R)
 . Samuel W. McCall (R)
 . John F. Fitzgerald (D)
 . Harrison H. Atwood (R)
 . William F. Draper (R)
 . Elijah A. Morse (R)
 . John Simpkins (R)

Michigan 
 . John B. Corliss (R)
 . George Spalding (R)
 . Alfred Milnes (R), from December 2, 1895
 . Henry F. Thomas (R)
 . William Alden Smith (R)
 . David D. Aitken (R)
 . Horace G. Snover (R)
 . William S. Linton (R)
 . Roswell P. Bishop (R)
 . Rousseau O. Crump (R)
 . John Avery (R)
 . Samuel M. Stephenson (R)

Minnesota 
 . James Albertus Tawney (R)
 . James T. McCleary (R)
 . Joel Heatwole (R)
 . Andrew R. Kiefer (R)
 . Loren Fletcher (R)
 . Charles A. Towne (R)
 . Frank Eddy (R)

Mississippi 
 . John M. Allen (D)
 . John C. Kyle (D)
 . Thomas C. Catchings (D)
 . Hernando D. Money (D)
 . John Sharp Williams (D)
 . Walter McKennon Denny (D)
 . James G. Spencer (D)

Missouri 
 . Charles N. Clark (R)
 . Uriel S. Hall (D)
 . Alexander M. Dockery (D)
 . George C. Crowther (R)
 . John C. Tarsney (D), until February 27, 1896
 Robert T. Van Horn (R), from February 27, 1896
 . David A. De Armond (D)
 . John P. Tracey (R)
 . Joel D. Hubbard (R)
 . William M. Treloar (R)
 . Richard Bartholdt (R)
 . Charles F. Joy (R)
 . Seth W. Cobb (D)
 . John H. Raney (R)
 . Norman A. Mozley (R)
 . Charles G. Burton (R)

Montana 
 . Charles S. Hartman (R)

Nebraska 
 . Jesse B. Strode (R)
 . David H. Mercer (R)
 . George D. Meiklejohn (R)
 . Eugene J. Hainer (R)
 . William E. Andrews (R)
 . Omer M. Kem (P)

Nevada 
 . Francis G. Newlands (S)

New Hampshire 
 . Cyrus A. Sulloway (R)
 . Henry M. Baker (R)

New Jersey 
 . Henry C. Loudenslager (R)
 . John J. Gardner (R)
 . Benjamin F. Howell (R)
 . Mahlon Pitney (R)
 . James F. Stewart (R)
 . Richard Wayne Parker (R)
 . Thomas McEwan Jr. (R)
 . Charles N. Fowler (R)

New York 
 . Richard Cunningham McCormick (R)
 . Denis M. Hurley (R)
 . Francis H. Wilson (R)
 . Israel F. Fischer (R)
 . Charles G. Bennett (R)
 . James R. Howe (R)
 . Franklin Bartlett (D)
 . James J. Walsh (D), until June 2, 1896
 John M. Mitchell (R), from June 2, 1896
 . Henry C. Miner (D)
 . Amos J. Cummings (D) from November 5, 1895
 . William Sulzer (D)
 . George B. McClellan Jr. (D)
 . Richard C. Shannon (R)
 . Lemuel E. Quigg (R)
 . Philip B. Low (R)
 . Benjamin L. Fairchild (R)
 . Benjamin Odell (R)
 . Jacob LeFever (R)
 . Frank S. Black (R), until January 7, 1897
 . George N. Southwick (R)
 . David F. Wilber (R)
 . Newton M. Curtis (R)
 . Wallace T. Foote Jr. (R)
 . Charles A. Chickering (R)
 . James S. Sherman (R)
 . George W. Ray (R)
 . Theodore L. Poole (R)
 . Sereno E. Payne (R)
 . Charles W. Gillet (R)
 . James W. Wadsworth (R)
 . Henry C. Brewster (R)
 . Rowland B. Mahany (R)
 . Charles Daniels (R)
 . Warren B. Hooker (R)

North Carolina 
 . Harry Skinner (P)
 . Frederick A. Woodard (D)
 . John G. Shaw (D)
 . William F. Strowd (P)
 . Thomas Settle III (R)
 . James A. Lockhart (D), until June 5, 1896
 Charles H. Martin (P), from June 5, 1896
 . Alonzo C. Shuford (P)
 . Romulus Z. Linney (R)
 . Richmond Pearson (R)

North Dakota 
 . Martin N. Johnson (R)

Ohio 
 . Charles P. Taft (R)
 . Jacob H. Bromwell (R)
 . Paul J. Sorg (D)
 . Fernando C. Layton (D)
 . Francis B. De Witt (R)
 . George W. Hulick (R)
 . George W. Wilson (R)
 . Luther M. Strong (R)
 . James H. Southard (R)
 . Lucien J. Fenton (R)
 . Charles H. Grosvenor (R)
 . David K. Watson (R)
 . Stephen R. Harris (R)
 . Winfield S. Kerr (R)
 . Henry C. Van Voorhis (R)
 . Lorenzo Danford (R)
 . Addison S. McClure (R)
 . Robert W. Tayler (R)
 . Stephen A. Northway (R)
 . Clifton B. Beach (R)
 . Theodore E. Burton (R)

Oregon 
 . Binger Hermann (R)
 . William R. Ellis (R)

Pennsylvania 
 . Henry H. Bingham (R)
 . Robert Adams Jr. (R)
 . Frederick Halterman (R)
 . John E. Reyburn (R)
 . Alfred C. Harmer (R)
 . John B. Robinson (R)
 . Irving P. Wanger (R)
 . Joseph J. Hart (D)
 . Constantine J. Erdman (D)
 . Marriott Brosius (R)
 . Joseph A. Scranton (R)
 . John Leisenring (R)
 . Charles N. Brumm (R)
 . Ephraim M. Woomer (R)
 . James H. Codding (R), from November 5, 1895
 . Fred C. Leonard (R)
 . Monroe H. Kulp (R)
 . Thaddeus M. Mahon (R)
 . James A. Stahle (R)
 . Josiah D. Hicks (R)
 . Daniel B. Heiner (R)
 . John Dalzell (R)
 . William A. Stone (R)
 . Ernest F. Acheson (R)
 . Thomas W. Phillips (R)
 . Matthew Griswold (R)
 . Charles W. Stone (R)
 . William C. Arnold (R)
 . Galusha A. Grow (R)
 . George F. Huff (R)

Rhode Island 
 . Melville Bull (R)
 . Warren O. Arnold (R)

South Carolina 
 . William Elliott (D), until June 4, 1896
 George W. Murray (R), from June 4, 1896
 . William J. Talbert (D)
 . Asbury C. Latimer (D)
 . Stanyarne Wilson (D)
 . Thomas J. Strait (D)
 . John L. McLaurin (D)
 . J. William Stokes (D), until June 1, 1896
 J. William Stokes (D), from November 3, 1896

South Dakota 
Both representatives were elected statewide on a general ticket.(2 Republicans)
 . Robert J. Gamble (R)
 . John A. Pickler (R)

Tennessee 
 . William C. Anderson (R)
 . Henry R. Gibson (R)
 . Foster V. Brown (R)
 . Benton McMillin (D)
 . James D. Richardson (D)
 . Joseph E. Washington (D)
 . Nicholas N. Cox (D)
 . John E. McCall (R)
 . James C. McDearmon (D)
 . Josiah Patterson (D)

Texas 
 . Joseph C. Hutcheson (D)
 . Samuel B. Cooper (D)
 . Charles H. Yoakum (D)
 . David B. Culberson (D)
 . Joseph W. Bailey (D)
 . Joseph Abbott (D)
 . George C. Pendleton (D)
 . Charles K. Bell (D)
 . Joseph D. Sayers (D)
 . Miles Crowley (D)
 . William H. Crain (D), until February 10, 1896
 Rudolph Kleberg (D), from April 7, 1896
 . George H. Noonan (R)
 . Jeremiah V. Cockrell (D)

Utah 
 . Clarence E. Allen (R), from January 4, 1896

Vermont 
 . H. Henry Powers (R)
 . William W. Grout (R)

Virginia 
 . William A. Jones (D)
 . D. Gardiner Tyler (D)
 . Tazewell Ellett (D)
 . William R. McKenney (D), until May 2, 1896
 Robert T. Thorp (R), from May 2, 1896
 . Claude A. Swanson (D)
 . Peter J. Otey (D)
 . Smith S. Turner (D)
 . Elisha E. Meredith (D)
 . James A. Walker (R)
 . Henry St. George Tucker III (D)

Washington 
Both representatives were elected statewide on a general ticket.(2 Republicans)
 . William H. Doolittle (R)
 . Samuel C. Hyde (R)

West Virginia 
 . Blackburn B. Dovener (R)
 . Alston G. Dayton (R)
 . James H. Huling (R)
 . Warren Miller (R)

Wisconsin 
 . Henry Allen Cooper (R)
 . Edward Sauerhering (R)
 . Joseph W. Babcock (R)
 . Theobald Otjen (R)
 . Samuel S. Barney (R)
 . Samuel A. Cook (R)
 . Michael Griffin (R)
 . Edward S. Minor (R)
 . Alexander Stewart (R)
 . John J. Jenkins (R)

Wyoming 
 . Frank W. Mondell (R)

Non-voting members
 . Nathan O. Murphy (R)
 . Thomas B. Catron (R)
 . Dennis T. Flynn (R)
 . Frank J. Cannon (R), until January 4, 1896

Changes in membership

The count below reflects changes from the beginning of the first session of this Congress.

Senate 
Two seats were added when Utah was admitted and one seat was filled late.

|-
| nowrap | Utah(1)
| New seat
| State was admitted to the Union
|  nowrap | Frank J. Cannon (R)
| January 22, 1896
| New seat
| nowrap | Utah(1)
| State was admitted to the Union
|  nowrap | Arthur Brown (R)
| January 22, 1896

|-
| nowrap | Delaware(2)
| Vacant
| Legislature had failed to elect.A successor was eventually elected
|  nowrap | Richard R. Kenney(D)
| January 19, 1897

|}

House of Representatives 
There were 4 deaths, 2 resignations, 13 election challenges, 1 new seat, and 4 seats vacant from the previous Congress. Democrats had a 10-seat net loss; Republicans had a 12-seat net gain; and Populists had a 2-seat net gain.

|-
| 
| Vacant
| Representative-elect Andrew J. Campbell died before the start of Congress.New member elected November 5, 1895.
|  nowrap | Amos J. Cummings (D)
| November 5, 1895

|-
| 
| Vacant
| Philip S. Post (R) was re-elected, but died before this Congress.New member elected December 2, 1895.
|  nowrap | George W. Prince (R)
| December 2, 1895

|-
| 
| Vacant
| Julius C. Burrows (R) was re-elected, but resigned in the previous Congress to serve in the Senate.New member elected December 2, 1895.
|  nowrap | Alfred Milnes (R)
| December 2, 1895

|-
| 
| Vacant
| Rep-elect Myron B. Wright died in office. New member elected November 5, 1895.
|  nowrap | James H. Codding (R)
| November 5, 1895

|-
| 
|  | Frank J. Cannon (R)
| Seat eliminated January 4, 1896, upon statehood.
| colspan=2 | Seat eliminated

|-
| 
| New seat
| State was admitted to the Union.New member elected November 5, 1895.
|  nowrap | Clarence E. Allen (R)
| January 4, 1896

|-
| 
|  nowrap | James C. C. Black (D)
| Resigned March 4, 1895.Incumbent was subsequently re-elected October 2, 1895.
|  nowrap | James C. C. Black (D)
| October 2, 1895

|-
| 
|  nowrap | William Cogswell (R)
| Died May 22, 1895.New member elected November 5, 1895.
|  nowrap | William H. Moody (R)
| November 5, 1895

|-
| 
|  nowrap | Frederick Remann (R)
| Died July 14, 1895.New member elected December 2, 1895.
|  nowrap | William F. L. Hadley (R)
| December 2, 1895

|-
| 
|  nowrap | Lawrence E. McGann (D)
| Election was successfully challenged December 27, 1895.
|  nowrap | Hugh R. Belknap (R)
| December 27, 1895

|-
| 
|  nowrap | William H. Crain (D)
| Died February 10, 1896.New member elected April 7, 1896.
|  nowrap | Rudolph Kleberg (D)
| April 7, 1896

|-
| 
|  nowrap | John C. Tarsney (D)
| Election was successfully challenged February 27, 1896.
|  nowrap | Robert T. Van Horn (R)
| February 27, 1896

|-
| 
|  nowrap | Gaston A. Robbins (D)
| Election was successfully challenged March 13, 1896.
|  nowrap | William F. Aldrich (R)
| March 13, 1896

|-
| 
|  nowrap | William R. McKenney (D)
| Election was successfully challenged May 2, 1896.
|  nowrap | Robert T. Thorp (R)
| May 2, 1896

|-
| 
|  nowrap | Charles J. Boatner (D)
| Election was challenged and declared vacant March 20, 1896.Incumbent was subsequently elected June 10, 1896.
|  nowrap | Charles J. Boatner (D)
| June 10, 1896

|-
| 
|  nowrap | James E. Cobb (D)
| Election was successfully challenged April 21, 1896.
|  nowrap | Albert T. Goodwyn (P)
| April 22, 1896

|-
| 
|  nowrap | J. William Stokes (D)
| Seat declared vacant June 1, 1896.Incumbent was subsequently elected November 3, 1896.
|  nowrap | J. William Stokes (D)
| November 3, 1896

|-
| 
|  nowrap | James J. Walsh (D)
| Election was successfully challenged June 2, 1896.
|  nowrap | John M. Mitchell (R)
| June 2, 1896

|-
| 
|  nowrap | William Elliott (D)
| Election was successfully challenged June 4, 1896.
|  nowrap | George W. Murray (R)
| June 4, 1896

|-
| 
|  nowrap | Finis E. Downing (D)
| Election was successfully challenged June 5, 1896.
|  nowrap | John I. Rinaker (R)
| June 5, 1896

|-
| 
|  nowrap | James A. Lockhart (D)
| Election was successfully challenged June 5, 1896.
|  nowrap | Charles H. Martin (P)
| June 5, 1896

|-
| 
|  nowrap | Oscar W. Underwood (D)
| Election was successfully challenged June 9, 1896.
|  nowrap | Truman H. Aldrich (R)
| June 9, 1896

|-
| 
|  nowrap | Charles F. Crisp (D)
| Died October 23, 1896.New member elected December 19, 1896.
|  nowrap | Charles R. Crisp (D)
| December 19, 1896

|-
| 
|  | Frank S. Black (R)
| Resigned January 7, 1897.
| colspan=2 | Vacant until next Congress

|-
| 
|  nowrap | Joseph M. Kendall (D)
| Election was successfully challenged February 18, 1897.
|  nowrap | Nathan T. Hopkins (R)
| February 18, 1897

|}

Committees

Senate

 Additional Accommodations for the Library of Congress (Select) (Chairman: Daniel W. Voorhees; Ranking Member: Shelby M. Cullom) 
 Agriculture and Forestry (Chairman: Redfield Proctor; Ranking Member: James Z. George)
 Appropriations (Chairman: William B. Allison; Ranking Member: Francis M. Cockrell)
 Audit and Control the Contingent Expenses of the Senate (Chairman: John P. Jones; Ranking Member: James K. Jones)
 Canadian Relations (Chairman: Thomas H. Carter; Ranking Member: Edward Murphy Jr.)
 Census (Chairman: William E. Chandler; Ranking Member: David Turpie)
 Civil Service and Retrenchment (Chairman: Jeter C. Pritchard; Ranking Member: John B. Gordon)
 Claims (Chairman: Watson C. Squire; Ranking Member: Samuel Pasco)
 Coast Defenses (Chairman: Watson C. Squire; Ranking Member: John B. Gordon)
 Commerce (Chairman: William P. Frye; Ranking Member: George G. Vest)
 Corporations Organized in the District of Columbia (Chairman: James K. Jones; Ranking Member: Isham G. Harris)
 Distributing Public Revenue Among the States (Select)
 District of Columbia (Chairman: James McMillan; Ranking Member: Isham G. Harris)
 Education and Labor (Chairman: George L. Shoup; Ranking Member: James Z. George)
 Engrossed Bills (Chairman: Francis M. Cockrell; Ranking Member: Lucien Baker)
 Enrolled Bills (Chairman: William J. Sewell; Ranking Member: Donelson Caffery)
 Epidemic Diseases (Chairman: George G. Vest; Ranking Member: Jacob H. Gallinger)
 Establish a University in the United States (Select)
 Examine the Several Branches in the Civil Service (Chairman: James H. Kyle; Ranking Member: George Gray)
 Finance (Chairman: Justin S. Morrill; Ranking Member: Daniel W. Voorhees)
 Fisheries (Chairman: George C. Perkins; Ranking Member: Wilkinson Call)
 Five Civilized Tribes of Indians (Select) (Chairman: George Gray; Ranking Member: Orville H. Platt)
 Foreign Relations (Chairman: John Sherman; Ranking Member: John Tyler Morgan)
 Forest Reservations (Select) (Chairman: William V. Allen)
 Geological Survey (Select) (Chairman: Stephen B. Elkins; Ranking Member: Edward C. Walthall)
 Immigration (Chairman: Henry Cabot Lodge; Ranking Member: David B. Hill)
 Indian Affairs (Chairman: Richard F. Pettigrew; Ranking Member: William V. Allen)
 Indian Depredations (Chairman: John L. Wilson; Ranking Member: William Lindsay) 
 International Expositions (Select) (Chairman: John M. Thurston; Ranking Member: George G. Vest)
 Interstate Commerce (Chairman: Shelby M. Cullom; Ranking Member: Arthur P. Gorman)
 Irrigation and Reclamation of Arid Lands (Chairman: Francis E. Warren; Ranking Member: Stephen M. White)
 Judiciary (Chairman: George F. Hoar; Ranking Member: James L. Pugh)
 Library (Chairman: Henry C. Hansbrough; Ranking Member: Daniel W. Voorhees)
 Manufactures (Chairman: George P. Wetmore; Ranking Member: Charles H. Gibson)
 Military Affairs (Chairman: Joseph R. Hawley; Ranking Member: William B. Bate)
 Mines and Mining (Chairman: William M. Stewart; Ranking Member: William B. Bate)
 Mississippi River and its Tributaries (Select) (Chairman: Knute Nelson)
 National Banks (Select) (Chairman: Lee Mantle; Ranking Member: John L. Mitchell)
 Naval Affairs (Chairman: J. Donald Cameron; Ranking Member: Joseph Clay Stiles Blackburn)
 Nicaragua Canal (Select) (Chairman: John Tyler Morgan; Ranking Member: John H. Mitchell)
 Organization, Conduct and Expenditures of the Executive Departments (Chairman: Marion Butler; Ranking Member: James Smith Jr.)
 Pacific Railroads (Chairman: John H. Gear; Ranking Member: Calvin S. Brice)
 Patents (Chairman: Orville H. Platt; Ranking Member: Wilkinson Call)
 Pensions (Chairman: Jacob H. Gallinger; Ranking Member: John M. Palmer)
 Post Office and Post Roads (Chairman: Edward O. Wolcott; Ranking Member: Marion Butler)
 Potomac River Front (Select) (Chairman: James Z. George; Ranking Member: William P. Frye)
 Printing (Chairman: Eugene Hale; Ranking Member: Arthur P. Gorman)
 Private Land Claims (Chairman: Isham G. Harris; Ranking Member: Eugene Hale)
 Privileges and Elections (Chairman: John H. Mitchell; Ranking Member: George Gray)
 Public Buildings and Grounds (Chairman: Matthew S. Quay; Ranking Member: George G. Vest)
 Public Health and National Quarantine (Chairman: George S. Vest)
 Public Lands (Chairman: Fred T. Dubois; Ranking Member: William V. Allen)
 Railroads (Chairman: Clarence D. Clark; Ranking Member: James H. Berry)
 Revision of the Laws (Chairman: Julius C. Burrows; Ranking Member: John W. Daniel)
 Revolutionary Claims (Chairman: James L. Pugh; Ranking Member: J. Donald Cameron)
 Rules (Chairman: Nelson W. Aldrich; Ranking Member: Joseph Clay Stiles Blackburn)
 Tariff Regulation (Select)
 Tennessee Centennial Exposition (Select)
 Territories (Chairman: Cushman K. Davis; Ranking Member: David B. Hill)
 Transportation and Sale of Meat Products (Select) (Chairman: Joseph C.S. Blackburn; Ranking Member: George P. Wetmore)
 Transportation Routes to the Seaboard (Chairman: George W. McBride; Ranking Member: John L. M. Irby)
 Trespassers upon Indian Lands (Select) (Chairman: Lucien Baker; Ranking Member: William N. Roach)
 Whole
 Woman Suffrage (Chairman: Wilkinson Call; Ranking Member: Matthew S. Quay) (Select)

House of Representatives

 Accounts (Chairman: J. Frank Aldrich; Ranking Member: Melville Bull)
 Agriculture (Chairman: James W. Wadsworth; Ranking Member: Horace G. Snover)
 Alcoholic Liquor Traffic (Chairman: Elijah A. Morse; Ranking Member: Jonathan S. Willis)
 Appropriations (Chairman: Joseph G. Cannon; Ranking Member: James A. Hemenway)
 Banking and Currency (Chairman: Joseph H. Walker; Ranking Member: Ebenezer J. Hill) 
 Claims (Chairman: Charles N. Brumm; Ranking Member: David G. Colson)
 Coinage, Weights and Measures (Chairman: Charles W. Stone; Ranking Member: Benjamin L. Fairchild)
 Disposition of Executive Papers
 District of Columbia (Chairman: Joseph W. Babcock; Ranking Member: George L. Wellington)
 Education (Chairman: Galusha A. Grow; Ranking Member: David A. De Armond)
 Election of the President, Vice President and Representatives in Congress (Chairman: Newton Martin Curtis; Ranking Member: John B. Corliss)
 Elections No.#1 (Chairman: Charles Daniels; Ranking Member: Romulus Z. Linney) 
 Elections No.#2 (Chairman: Henry U. Johnson; Ranking Member: Chester I. Long)
 Elections No.#3 (Chairman: Samuel W. McCall; Ranking Member: James H. Codding)
 Enrolled Bills (Chairman: Alva L. Hager; Ranking Member: Benjamin E. Russell)
 Expenditures in the Agriculture Department (Chairman: Charles W. Gillet; Ranking Member: Uriel S. Hall)
 Expenditures in the Interior Department (Chairman: Charles Curtis; Ranking Member: William Sulzer)
 Expenditures in the Justice Department(Chairman: William R. Ellis; Ranking Member: Henry Gray Turner)
 Expenditures in the Navy Department (Chairman: Henry F. Thomas; Ranking Member: Smith S. Turner)
 Expenditures in the Post Office Department (Chairman: Henry H. Bingham; Ranking Member: Henry W. Ogden)
 Expenditures in the State Department (Chairman: Lemuel E. Quigg; Ranking Member: Rufus E. Lester)
 Expenditures in the Treasury Department (Chairman: Charles H. Grosvenor; Ranking Member: J. William Stokes)
 Expenditures in the War Department (Chairman: William W. Grout; Ranking Member: Jeremiah V. Cockrell)
 Expenditures on Public Buildings (Chairman: Thomas Settle; Ranking Member: Oscar W. Underwood)
 Foreign Affairs (Chairman: Robert R. Hitt; Ranking Member: Richmond Pearson)
 Immigration and Naturalization (Chairman: Richard Bartholdt; Ranking Member: Rowland B. Mahany)
 Irrigation of Arid Lands (Chairman: Binger Hermann; Ranking Member: Samuel C. Hyde)
 Indian Affairs (Chairman: James S. Sherman; Ranking Member: George E. White)
 Interstate and Foreign Commerce (Chairman: William P. Hepburn; Ranking Member: John B. Corliss)
 Invalid Pensions (Chairman: John A. Pickler; Ranking Member: William E. Andrews)
 Judiciary (Chairman: David B. Henderson; Ranking Member: Foster V. Brown) 
 Labor (Chairman: Thomas W. Phillips; Ranking Member: Paul J. Sorg)
 Levees and Improvements of the Mississippi River (Chairman: George W. Ray; Ranking Member: W. Godfrey Hunter)
 Library (Chairman: Alfred C. Harmer; Ranking Member: Amos J. Cummings)
 Manufactures (Chairman: Lewis D. Apsley; Ranking Member: Monroe H. Kulp)
 Merchant Marine and Fisheries (Chairman: Sereno E. Payne; Ranking Member: Edward S. Minor)
 Mileage (Chairman: Ashley B. Wright; Ranking Member: George C. Pendleton)
 Military Affairs (Chairman: John A.T. Hull; Ranking Member: Lucien J. Fenton)
 Militia (Chairman: Benjamin F. Marsh; Ranking Member: Richard W. Parker)
 Mines and Mining (Chairman: David D. Aitken; Ranking Member: Frank M. Eddy)
 Naval Affairs (Chairman: Charles A. Boutelle; Ranking Member: Alston G. Dayton)
 Pacific Railroads (Chairman: H. Henry Powers; Ranking Member: George W. Faris)
 Patents (Chairman: William F. Draper; Ranking Member: Winfield S. Kerr)
 Pensions (Chairman: Henry C. Loudenslager; Ranking Member: Alexander M. Hardy)
 Post Office and Post Roads (Chairman: Eugene F. Loud; Ranking Member: Orrin L. Miller)
 Printing (Chairman: George D. Perkins; Ranking Member: James D. Richardson)
 Private Land Claims (Chairman: George W. Smith; Ranking Member: Benjamin F. Howell)
 Public Buildings and Grounds (Chairman: Seth L. Milliken; Ranking Member: Samuel C. Hyde)
 Public Lands (Chairman: John F. Lacey; Ranking Member: John F. Shafroth)
 Railways and Canals (Chairman: Charles A. Chickering; Ranking Member: Thomas McEwan Jr.)
 Reform in the Civil Service (Chairman: Marriott Brosius; Ranking Member: James McLachlan)
 Revision of Laws (Chairman: William W. Bowers; Ranking Member: Theobald Otjen)
 Rivers and Harbors (Chairman: Warren B. Hooker; Ranking Member: Blackburn B. Dovener)
 Rules (Chairman: Thomas B. Reed; Ranking Member: Charles F. Crisp) 
 Standards of Official Conduct
 Territories (Chairman: Joseph A. Scranton; Ranking Member: Philip B. Low)
 Ventilation and Acoustics (Chairman: William S. Linton; Ranking Member: Harry Skinner)
 War Claims (Chairman: Thaddeus M. Mahon; Ranking Member: Samuel Pugh)
 Ways and Means (Chairman: Nelson Dingley; Ranking Member: Walter Evans)
 Whole

Joint committees

 Alcohol in the Arts (Select)
 Conditions of Indian Tribes (Special)
 Disposition of (Useless) Executive Papers
 Investigate Charities and Reformatory Institutions in the District of Columbia
 The Library
 Printing
 Ford's Theater Disaster

Caucuses
 Democratic (House)
 Democratic (Senate)

Employees

Legislative branch agency directors
 Architect of the Capitol: Edward Clark
 Librarian of Congress: Ainsworth Rand Spofford 
 Public Printer of the United States: Thomas E. Benedict

Senate 
 Chaplain: William H. Millburn (Methodist)
 Secretary: William Ruffin Cox
 Librarian: Alonzo M. Church
 Sergeant at Arms: Richard J. Bright

House of Representatives 
 Chaplain: Edward P. Bagby (Disciples of Christ), until December 2, 1895
 Henry N. Couden (Universalist), elected December 2, 1895
 Clerk: James Kerr, until December 2, 1895
 Alexander McDowell, from December 2, 1895
 Clerk at the Speaker's Table: Asher C. Hinds
 Doorkeeper: William J. Glenn, elected December 2, 1895
 Postmaster: Joseph C. McElroy, elected December 2, 1895
 Reading Clerks: E.L. Sampson (D) and R.S. Hatcher (R)
 Sergeant at Arms: Herman W. Snow, until December 2, 1895
 Benjamin F. Russell, from December 2, 1895

See also 
 1894 United States elections (elections leading to this Congress)
 1894–95 United States Senate elections
 1894 United States House of Representatives elections
 1896 United States elections (elections during this Congress, leading to the next Congress)
 1896 United States presidential election
 1896–97 United States Senate elections
 1896 United States House of Representatives elections

References

External links
 Biographical Directory of the U.S. Congress
 U.S. House of Representatives: House History
 U.S. Senate: Statistics and Lists